Balyaga is an urban locality (an urban-type settlement) in Petrovsk-Zabaykalsky District of Zabaykalsky Krai, Russia. Population:

References

Urban-type settlements in Zabaykalsky Krai